"Mellow Yellow" is a 1966 song by Donovan.

Mellow Yellow may also refer to:

Mellow Yellow (album), the Donovan album on which the song appears
Mellow Yellow coffeeshop, an Amsterdam cannabis shop
Mello Yello, a soft drink
King Mellow Yellow, a Jamaican deejay